Sporomusa ovata is a species of bacteria with characteristic banana-shaped cells. Its cells are strictly anaerobic, Gram-negative, endospore-forming, straight to slightly curved rods that are motile by means of lateral flagella. It has been the subject of much research into electrosynthesis of energy-containing carbon chains.

Sporomusa ovata is a candidate as the biological catalyst for an "artificial leaf" that converts sunlight, water, and carbon dioxide into oxygen and liquid fuels.

References

External links 
LPSN
Type strain of Sporomusa ovata at BacDive -  the Bacterial Diversity Metadatabase

Veillonellaceae
Bacteria described in 1984